Ophiorrhabda mormopa is a moth of the family Tortricidae. It is found in Thailand, the Philippines, India, Sri Lanka, Sumatra, Borneo and Australia.

References

Moths described in 1906
Olethreutini